FC Knyazha-2 Schaslyve was the reserve or 2nd squad of the Ukrainian Football club FC Knyazha Schaslyve.

Career
After the winter break before the resumption of competition in March 2009 the administration of FC Knyazha Schaslyve removed both the main club from Persha Liha and its reserve team FC Knyazha-2 Schaslyve from the Druha Liha.

FC Knyazha-2 entered the professional leagues for the first time in 2008 after the successes and improvement the senior team had in the previous season. The club decided to enter the club into the Druha Liha to give their players more exposure to higher quality competition. Knyazha-2 had been competing in the Kyiv Oblast competition.

Coaches 
 Borys Rudenko (2008)

References

External links 
  

 
FC Knyazha Shchaslyve
Defunct football clubs in Ukraine
Ukrainian reserve football teams
Boryspil Raion
Football clubs in Kyiv Oblast
2008 establishments in Ukraine
2009 disestablishments in Ukraine
Association football clubs established in 2008
Association football clubs disestablished in 2009